Majlesi may refer to:
 
 Shahrak-e Majlesi, a village located south of Isfahan, Iran
 Islamic Azad University of Majlesi, one of the branches of Islamic Azad University, located in Shahrak-e Majlesi
 Mohammad Taqi Majlesi (1594-1660), Majlesi-ye Awwal— Majlesi the First, an Islamic cleric during the Safavid era
 Mohammad-Baqer Majlesi (1627–1699), Iranian Twelver Shi'a cleric during the Safavid era